Ash Lake is an unincorporated community in Saint Louis County, Minnesota, United States; located within the Kabetogama State Forest.

It lies along U.S. Highway 53 near UT Road 8146, Jacobs Road. The Ash River and Ash Lake are both in the vicinity.

References

 Official State of Minnesota Highway Map – 2019/2020 edition

External links
Ash River Trails

Unincorporated communities in Minnesota
Unincorporated communities in St. Louis County, Minnesota